Gouda cheese ("cheese from Gouda") is a sweet, creamy, yellow cow's milk cheese originating from the Netherlands. It is one of the most popular cheeses worldwide. The name is used today as a general term for numerous similar cheeses produced in the traditional Dutch manner.

History

The first mention of Gouda cheese dates from 1284, making it one of the oldest recorded cheeses in the world still made today. Cheesemaking traditionally was a woman's task in Dutch culture, with farmers' wives passing their cheesemaking skills on to their daughters. During summer months in the city of Gouda, South Holland, there is a cheese market in traditional style once a week primarily as a tourist attraction. Most Dutch Gouda is now produced industrially. However, some 300 Dutch farmers still produce boerenkaas (“farmer's cheese”) which is a protected form of Gouda made in the traditional manner, using unpasteurized milk.

The cheese is named after the master of Gouda, not because it was produced in or around that city, but because it was traded there. In the Middle Ages, Dutch cities could obtain certain feudal rights which gave them primacy or a total monopoly on certain goods. Within the County of Holland, Gouda acquired market rights on cheese, the sole right to have a market in which the county's farmers could sell their cheese. All the cheeses would be taken to the market square in Gouda to be sold. Buyers then sampled the cheeses and negotiated a price using a ritual bargaining system called handjeklap in which buyers and sellers clap each other's hands and shout out prices. Once a price was agreed upon, the porters would carry the cheese to the weighing house and complete the sale.

Process

Various sources suggest that the term Gouda refers more to a general style of cheesemaking rather than to a specific kind of cheese, pointing to its taste, which  varies with age. Young (and factory-produced) Gouda has been described as having a flavour that is "lightly fudgy with nuts, but very, very, very mild", while the same source describes a more mature farmhouse Gouda as having a "lovely fruity tang" with a "sweet finish", that may take on "an almost butterscotch flavor" if aged over two years.

After cultured milk is curdled, some of the whey is then drained and water is added. This is called "washing the curd", and creates a sweeter cheese, as the washing removes some of the lactose, resulting in a reduction of lactic acid produced. About 10% of the mixture is curds, which are pressed into circular molds for several hours. These molds are the essential reason behind its traditional, characteristic shape. The cheese is then soaked in a brine solution, which gives the cheese and its rind a distinctive taste.

The cheese is dried for a few days before being coated with a yellow wax or plastic-like  coating to prevent it from drying out, then it is aged, during which process the cheese changes from semi-hard to hard. Dutch cheese makers generally use six gradations, or categories, to classify the cheese:
 Young cheese (4 weeks)
 Young matured	(8–10 weeks)
 Matured (16–18 weeks)
 Extra matured	(7–9 months)
 Old cheese (10–12 months)
 Very old cheese (12 months and more)

As it ages, it develops a caramel sweetness and has a slight crunchiness from cheese crystals, especially in older cheeses. In the Netherlands, cubes of Gouda are often eaten as a snack served with Dutch mustard. Older varieties are sometimes topped with sugar or apple butter. Cubes of Gouda are commonly served as a snack along with beer in traditional Dutch Brown Bars.

Protection
The term "Gouda" is not restricted to cheese of Dutch origin. However, “Boerenkaas”, “Noord-Hollandse Gouda”, and “Gouda Holland” are protected geographical indications in the European Union. These cheeses can be made only in the Netherlands (although not only in the Dutch provinces of South Holland, in which Gouda is situated) and can use milk produced only by Dutch cows.

See also

 List of cheeses
 List of Dutch cheeses
 List of smoked foods

References

External links

 
 A collection of old pictures and drawings of Gouda. (A journey through the past)

Cow's-milk cheeses
Dutch cheeses
Dutch cuisine
Gouda, South Holland
Smoked cheeses